Konrad Miersch (19 January 1907 – 2 March 1942) was a German modern pentathlete. He competed at the 1932 Summer Olympics. He was killed in action during World War II.

References

External links
 

1907 births
1942 deaths
German male modern pentathletes
Olympic modern pentathletes of Germany
Modern pentathletes at the 1932 Summer Olympics
People from Bad Freienwalde
German military personnel killed in World War II
Sportspeople from Brandenburg
20th-century German people